The HSBC Brazil Cup was an international golf exhibition tournament, sanctioned by the LPGA Tour and first played in 2009. The tournament took place over two days and 36 holes at the Itanhanga Golf Club in Rio de Janeiro, Brazil. The money earned did not count on the official LPGA money list, making the event an unofficial part of the LPGA Tour.  

The field for the inaugural event in January 2009 included only 15 players: 14 LPGA Tour members and a Brazilian amateur. In 2010, the field was expanded to 27 players, which included two amateurs, and was moved to late May. The 2011 tournament included thirty players, all professionals.

The tournament title sponsor was HSBC, the world's largest banking group, with headquarters in London.

Tournament names through the years:
2009–12: HSBC LPGA Brasil Cup

Winners

1 Won on the sixth playoff hole.

Tournament record

References

External links

LPGA official tournament microsite

Former LPGA Tour events
Golf tournaments in Brazil
LPGA Bazil Cup
Women's sport in Brazil